Ronald Runaldo Venetiaan (born 18 June 1936) is a former politician who served as the 6th President of Suriname.

Biography
Venetiaan was born in Paramaribo. In 1955, Venetiaan left Suriname to study mathematics and physics at the University of Leiden. In 1964, he obtained his doctorandus, and returned to Suriname to become a mathematics and physics teacher.

In 1973 Venetiaan was Minister of Education for the National Party of Suriname (NPS) in the government of Henck Arron. He was disposed by the 1980 Surinamese coup d'état. Venetiaan decided to teach at the Anton de Kom University.

In 1987, Venetiaan returned to politics as the Chairman of the National Party of Suriname, and as the Minister of Education.

His first term as president ran from 1991 to 1996, after which he lost in the elections to Jules Wijdenbosch. In 2000 however, he regained his former position on the New Front banner, receiving an absolute majority of 37 from 51 votes in the Parliament.

In 2005 he was re-elected to serve a third term as president and sworn in on August 12, 2005. Venetiaan relinquished the Chair of the NPS to Gregory Rusland in 2012, and retired from politics in 2013. Venetiaan thought that it was time that the younger generation take over.

Personal life
Venetiaan is a mathematician beside all political activity. His surname means Venetian (a person from Venice) in Dutch. Venetiaan published his first poetry under the pseudonym Vene in Mamio (1962). Most his work was never published but was performed in theatre plays. Venetiaan had also used the pseudonym Krumanty. Venetiaan is a collaborator on Chan Santokhi's We gaan Suriname redden (We are going to save Suriname) of 2020.

Ronald Venetiaan is married to Liesbeth Vanenburg, and has three daughters and one son.

References

External links

Poetry of Venetiaan at Digital Library for Dutch Literature (in Dutch and Sranan Tongo)

1936 births
Living people
Presidents of Suriname
Education ministers of Suriname
Honorary Order of the Yellow Star
Leiden University alumni
Members of the National Assembly (Suriname)
National Party of Suriname politicians
People from Paramaribo
Surinamese Roman Catholics
Surinamese poets
Surinamese mathematicians
Anton de Kom University of Suriname faculty